Brittney Karbowski is an American voice actress who has appeared in numerous anime films, television series and video games. Along with her voice over work since her debut in 2004, Karbowski is known for her roles as Mikoto Misaka in A Certain Magical Index, Rimuru Tempest in That Time I Got Reincarnated as a Slime, Black Star in Soul Eater, Camie Utsushimi in My Hero Academia, Wendy Marvell in Fairy Tail and Nanachi in Made in Abyss. This list is exclusive to either main characters she has played, or minor characters with recurring roles.

Anime

2004–2009

2010–2015

2016–present

Film

Video games

Live-action roles

Notes

References

Actress filmographies
American filmographies